Peter Prause (born 17 March 1943) is a German boxer. He competed in the men's featherweight event at the 1972 Summer Olympics. At the 1972 Summer Olympics, he lost to Jochen Bachfeld of East Germany.

References

1943 births
Living people
German male boxers
Olympic boxers of West Germany
Boxers at the 1972 Summer Olympics
Boxers from Berlin
Featherweight boxers